In mathematics, the truncated power function with exponent  is defined as

In particular,

and interpret the exponent as conventional power.

Relations
 Truncated power functions can be used for construction of B-splines.
  is the Heaviside function.
  where  is the indicator function.
 Truncated power functions are refinable.

See also 
 Macaulay brackets

External links
Truncated Power Function on MathWorld

References

Numerical analysis